There have been three baronetcies created for descendants of the ancient Norman family of Molyneux who were granted extensive estates in Lancashire after the Norman Conquest.

The baronetcy of Molyneux of Sefton was created in the Baronetage of England on 22 May 1611 for Richard Molyneux, Member of Parliament for Lancashire on three occasions 1584 to 1611. Successors were raised to the peerage as Viscount Molyneux and Earl of Sefton.

The baronetcy of Molyneux of Teversall was created in the baronetage of England on 29 June 1611 for John Molyneux, of a junior branch of the family. Their seat at Teversal, near Mansfield, Nottinghamshire came into the family via the 16th-century marriage of Francis Molyneux to the Teversall heiress, Elizabeth Greenhalgh, and later the Wellow estate, also in Nottinghamshire, devolved upon Sir William Molyneux, 6th Baronet, through his marriage to Anne Challand.
This baronetcy became extinct on his only son's death in 1812, the unmarried 7th Baronet, when these Molyneux estates passed to his sister and heir Juliana Molyneux (1749–1808) who married Henry Howard, of Glossop (1713–1787), a descendant of the 22nd Earl of Arundel: their eldest son succeeded as 12th Duke of Norfolk and their second son, Lord Henry Thomas Howard-Molyneux-Howard (1766–1824), had a daughter, Henrietta Anna, who married Henry John George Herbert, 3rd Earl of Carnarvon, whose eldest son, the 4th Earl, was Henry Howard Molyneux Herbert starting a tradition for the Herberts to pass on Molyneux as a middle name.

A third baronetcy namely Molyneux of Castle Dillon, County Armagh was created in the Baronetage of Ireland on 4 July 1730 for Thomas Molyneux, a distinguished doctor. His family, who are first recorded in Calais around 1530, settled in Ireland about 1576.

Molyneux of Sefton, Lancashire (1611)
 Sir Richard Molyneux, 1st Baronet (1560–1622)
 Sir Richard Molyneux, 2nd Baronet (created Viscount Molyneux in 1628)
 For further succession see Earl of Sefton
Extinct on the death of the 7th and last Earl of Sefton

Molyneux of Teversall, Nottinghamshire (1611)
 Sir John Molyneux, 1st Baronet, High Sheriff of Nottinghamshire 1610 and 1612
 Sir Francis Molyneux, 2nd Baronet (1602–1674)
 Sir John Molyneux, 3rd Baronet (1625–1674)
 Sir Francis Molyneux, 4th Baronet (1656–1742) Member of Parliament for Newark 1693–1700 and for Nottinghamshire 1701–05
 Sir Charles Molyneux, 5th Baronet (died 1764), High Sheriff of Nottinghamshire 1746 (succeeded by his brother)
 Sir William Molyneux, 6th Baronet (died 1781), High Sheriff of Nottinghamshire 1737
 Sir Francis Molyneux, 7th Baronet (died 1812), Gentleman Usher of the Black Rod 1765
 Sir Darcy Molyneux, 8th Baronet (died 1816).

The line became extinct after the 8th Baronet.

Molyneux of Castle Dillon, County Armagh (1730)
Sir Thomas Molyneux, 1st Baronet (1661–1733)
Sir Daniel Molyneux, 2nd Baronet
Sir Capel Molyneux, 3rd Baronet, PC (1717–1797)
Sir Capel Molyneux, 4th Baronet
Sir Thomas Molyneux, 5th Baronet
Sir George King Adlercron Molyneux, 6th Baronet
Sir Capel Molyneux, 7th Baronet
Sir John William Henry Molyneux, 8th Baronet
Sir John Charles Molyneux, 9th Baronet
Sir Ernest Molyneux, 10th Baronet (died 1940) 
Extinct on the 10th baronet's death

See also
 Molyneux

Citations

Notes
 A Genealogical and Heraldic History of the Extinct and Dormant Baronetcies of England Ireland and Scotland 2nd Edition (1844) John and John Bernard Burke. p. 360 Google Books
 Journal of the Craigavon Historical Society 1996/97

External links
 www.burkespeerage.com

 

Extinct baronetcies in the Baronetage of England
Extinct baronetcies in the Baronetage of Ireland
1611 establishments in England